The United States House of Representatives elections in California, 1908 was an election for California's delegation to the United States House of Representatives, which occurred as part of the general election of the House of Representatives on November 3, 1908. All eight districts remained Republican.

Overview

Results

District 1

District 2

District 3

District 4

District 5

District 6

District 7

District 8

See also 
61st United States Congress
Political party strength in California
Political party strength in U.S. states
United States House of Representatives elections, 1908

References 
California Elections Page
Office of the Clerk of the House of Representatives

External links 
California Legislative District Maps (1911-Present)
RAND California Election Returns: District Definitions

California
1908
United States House of Representatives